is a fictional character from the light novel, manga, and anime series KonoSuba written by Natsume Akatsuki. In the universe of Konosuba, a parallel world with MMORPG elements, Megumin is a sorcerer who joins protagonist Kazuma Sato's party in an attempt to defeat the Devil King. Due to the party's dysfunctional abilities, Kazuma quickly gives up on the idea of defeating the Devil King and tries to live a comfortable lifestyle, only to find the circumstances of his daily life force him and his party to encounter and battle the Devil King's generals. 

Megumin has become a KonoSuba breakout character. Critical response to Megumin has been positive, with particular praise focused on the humour of the character's gags. Rie Takahashi's performance as the voice actress for Megumin has also been praised. The character's popularity led to Megumin becoming the lead character in KonoSuba: God's Blessing on This Wonderful World! Legend of Crimson, which explores her background as well as a series of prequels detailing her past before meeting Kazuma's group. She is also starring in her own spinoff show titled Konosuba: An Explosion on This Wonderful World! based on the Light Novel of the same name which explores her story two years prior to the events of the main show and is set to release in April 2023.

Creation

Megumin was created by Akatsuki Natsume who noted that she exposed an aura fitting of an appealing heroine which led to her popularity overshadowing the actual heroine, Aqua.

In Japanese, Megumin is voiced by Rie Takahashi while Erica Mendez provided her voice in the English language, which is done by Los Angeles-based Bang Zoom! Entertainment. For the movie, Takahashi tease the appeal of Megumin when being alongside her party and town as she claims the character is unable to do things on her own. Since Megumin is the main focus of the 2019 movie, Takahashi recalls Director Kanasaki wanting her to give Megumin a cool appeal which often led to recordings where Takahashi was confused. This was mostly when Megumin and Kazuma interact in an apparent romantic fashion. She attempted to give Megumin a more girly side some which made a major contrast to most of her previous scenes. In retrospective, Takahashi enjoyed the film for how it further expanded Megumin's story.

Appearances
Megumin is a 14 year-old  archwizard who is part of the Crimson Demons race – modified humans who possess dark brown hair, crimson eyes, powerful magic affinity, and chūnibyō characteristics. with an eye patch for aesthetic reasons. Megumin only knows a single, incredibly powerful Explosion spell that immediately depletes her mana and incapacitates her after a single use, and refuses to learn any other skills. Due to the strength and resulting fallout of the spell, she struggles to find a party who would accept her prior to meeting Kazuma. In the process, she eventually falls in love with Kazuma. She confesses her feelings to him, leading them to become a couple, but their secret is exposed when Darkness confesses her love to him as well. She was called an explosion maniac by Kazuma.

A Megumin-focused spin-off light novel series, also written and illustrated by Akatsuki and Mishima respectively, titled  and takes place a year prior to the main series. A sequel novel was released.

The character also appears in the crossover series Isekai Quartet.

Personality 
Megumin's personality is characterized by her boisterous and eccentric nature, which is further accentuated by her love for theatrics. As a member of the Crimson Magic Clan, she displays chuunibyou tendencies, and she has a fondness for giving strange names to people and things. Despite her cocky and arrogant demeanor, she has a childish and immature side, which is evident in her sensitivity towards her age and underdeveloped body. She often finds herself becoming despondent or aggressive when treated like a child. Although she maintains a petty rivalry with her old classmate Yunyun, she secretly sees her as a friend and never misses an opportunity to bully and harass her.

Megumin's obsession with explosion magic is one of her most defining traits. She invests all her stat increases in perfecting her one explosion spell, which she considers the most powerful and useful magic. Her refusal to learn any other type of magic often gets her into trouble, and she will go to great lengths to protect her explosion magic, even if it means disregarding logic and consequences. Despite her shortcomings, Megumin is acknowledged by Kazuma as having the most common sense of the group. She is fairly intelligent and adept at magic, and her love and loyalty towards her friends are unwavering, and she will fiercely protect them if necessary.

Reception
Megumin in particular has been considered one of the series' most popular characters, winning Sneaker Bunko's official Favorite KonoSuba Character poll. In another poll from 2019, Megumin took second place behind Aqua. She was also the sixth-highest vote in Newtype 2015–16 Awards for Best Female Character (Kazuma was third in the male category) and received the most "Other" votes in the Best Girl category in Crunchyroll's Anime Awards 2016. SportsKeeda listed Megumin as one of the ten anime characters "that no one hates" due to how she overshadows the unlikable heroine Aqua from the same series while her preference for explosions is "impressive". In analyzing character designs, Otaku USA deemed Megumin's eyepatch to be more of a subversion of common eyepatches in anime fashion as Megumin just uses it for fashion. An isekai smartphone app featuring dialogues of Megumin was also released in Japan.

The character is often seen as one of the best heroines from KonoSuba, with sites comparing her with Aqua and Darkness. Anime UK News felt the animation of Megumin's explosions were well executed in the anime. Anime News Network (ANN) said that Megumin and Aqua are the series' best characters as their gags are hilarious in contrast to the less appealing Kazuma and Darkness. According to ComicBook, the character of Megumin is noticeably popular within cosplayers and merchandising in general. Comic Book Resources went to call Megumin one of the most valuable players detailing five events in the narrative but still had several downfalls such as her poor treatment of YunYun. In another article, she was referred to as a great hero but at the same time had several reasons to why she would be appealing also as a villain.

Jordan Ramée at GameSpot found the film struggling to "capture the same tone as the anime series because it splits up the core group of characters" to focus on Kazuma and Megumin which he criticized for as "dull" due to how it leads to repeat the same joke several times while later gags were criticized for not fitting the homophobic humor of the movie. Nevertheless, he still praised the focus on the duo's relationship for giving them a romantic tone. Furthermore, the further exploration of Megumin and Yunyun's relationship was praised for being explored for the first time. ANN stated that the movie continued capturing the appeal of Megumin's jokes alongside her background while advancing her relationship with Kazuma. Biggest In Japan stated that the movie fully explored Megumin's character and world to the point of overshadowing the rest female characters but certain explored content might come across as problematic. CouchSoap described Megumin's character and party as one of the worst groups in the isekai genre which makes the series comical, pointing out how useless Megumin can be due to her obsession with only one magic spell.

The Fandom Post also praised Megumin's role in her spinoff An Explosion on this Wonderful World for the gags she provides. The success of Megumin's spin-off led to The Fandom Post comment that he looks forward to more spin-offs centered around other supporting characters. Anime UK also appreciated the handling of other relationships involving Megumin such as her pet which was barely explored in the main series as well as Yunyun. In a further review, the same site commented the spin-off would please any fan of the break out character and felt that Megumin's and Yunyun's relationship would need more convincing.

The voice acting has also been a subject of praise; Nick Creamer of ANN commended Sora Amamiya and Rie Takahashi's roles as Aqua and Megumin for the energy provided in their performances, Anime UK News felt Takahashi was appealing thanks to her deliveries but was overshadowed by Kazuma and Aqua's actors. Erica Mendez's performance as Megumin in the English dub attracted positive response with SportsKeeda listing Megumin as one of her best roles due to how her character was written.

References

KonoSuba
Literary characters introduced in 2012
Fantasy anime and manga characters
Female characters in anime and manga
Teenage characters in anime and manga
Anime and manga characters who use magic
Anime and manga sidekicks
Fictional characters with fire or heat abilities
Fictional wandfighters
Fictional wizards